Shin Fujiyama is a Japanese-American philanthropist who co-founded Students Helping Honduras.

Fujiyama was born in a small fishing village in Japan.  He graduated from the University of Mary Washington in Fredericksburg, Virginia in 2007 with a Bachelor's degree in International Affairs and Pre-medicine. He and his sister, Cosmo Fujiyama, incorporated Students Helping Honduras in 2007 after visiting Honduras on a service learning trip for the first time. Shin speaks four languages fluently: Japanese, English, Spanish, and Portuguese.

Awards 
 Changing Our World/Simms Award for Outstanding Youth in Philanthropy, Ages 18–23
 CNN Heroes 2009 Award

References 

1984 births
Living people
American philanthropists
Japanese emigrants to the United States
Japanese philanthropists
University of Mary Washington alumni